Ananda Chakrapani is an Indian actor who works in Telugu-language films. He garnered acclaim for his performance in Mallesham (2019).

Early life 
He was born in Gaddamvari Yadavalli village of Kanagal mandal in Nalgonda district of Telangana State. His family migrated to Kondrapole village in Dameracherla mandal near  Miryalaguda.
He started working in a printing press since his school days to support himself. Before joining films he worked in Advertising Agencies as visualizer and copy writer.

Career 
He made his film debut with B. Narsing Rao's award-winning film Daasi (1988); but the film failed to give him a breakthrough as an actor. He landed the role in Daasi after he met Devipriya, one of the screenplay writers for Daasi. Devipriya recommended him to Narsing Rao. In 2013, he began directing a documentary titled Waiting for Death about the impact of fluorosis on people living in his hometown of Nalgonda. Twenty-five years after Daasi, he was signed to play the role of Chintakindi Mallesham's father in Mallesham (2019). He received the role after Laxman Aelay, the production designer for Mallesham, suggested his name to the director Raj. Since Raj was in the United States at the time, the audition was conducted by his assistant. Although Ananda Chakrapani was unsuccessful in his initial audition, he requested for a second audition and was selected by Raj's assistant. His performance in Mallesham enabled him to receive further film offers.

He started getting more offers after he played a role in Mallesham. His notable films include Vakeel Saab, Telugu remake of Pink starring Pawan Kalyan, and Love story directed by Sekhar Kammula.

Filmography 
All films are in Telugu, unless otherwise noted.

References

External links 

20th-century Indian male actors
21st-century Indian male actors
Living people
Telugu male actors
Male actors in Telugu cinema
Year of birth missing (living people)
Indian male film actors